Karthavya (Kannada: ಕರ್ತವ್ಯ) is a 1985 Indian Kannada film, directed by K. S. R. Das and produced by Padmanabham. The film stars Vishnuvardhan, Pavithra, Sudarshan and Lokanath in the lead roles. The film has musical score by Chellapilla Satyam.

Cast

Vishnuvardhan
Pavithra
Sudarshan
Lokanath
Vishwanath
Suryakumar
Srikanth
Subramanya
Pattabhi
Vijaykumar
Rajakumar
G. N. Swamy
B. Jayashree
Devishree
Jayamalini
Jayasheela
Shailashree in Guest Appearance

References

External links
 

1985 films
1980s Kannada-language films
Films directed by K. S. R. Das
Films scored by Satyam (composer)